Gary Fleder (born December 19, 1965) is an American film director, screenwriter, and producer. His most recently completed film, Homefront, was released by Open Road Films and Millennium Films in November 2013. In recent years he has been a prolific director of television pilots.

Life and career
Fleder was born to a Jewish family in Norfolk, Virginia, the son of Lorraine and Harry Fleder. A graduate of Boston University and the USC School of Cinematic Arts, Fleder began his television career in 1993 with an award-winning episode of Tales from the Crypt ("Forever Ambergris", starring Steve Buscemi and Roger Daltrey). Since then, he has directed pilots and episodes of more than a dozen television series, including L.A. Doctors, Blind Justice, The Evidence, The Shield, Life on Mars, Happy Town, Star-Crossed, Turn: Washington's Spies and Kingdom. He was an executive producer and frequent director of October Road, Life Unexpected, and The Art of More.

Fleder directed "Subway" a 1996 episode of Homicide: Life on the Street that earned a Peabody Award for its guest star, Vincent D’Onofrio. He also collaborated with producer Tom Hanks to direct an episode of the Emmy Award winning mini-series From the Earth to the Moon.

Things to Do in Denver When You're Dead, Fleder's feature film debut, premiered at the 1995 Cannes Film Festival. This crime film, written by Fleder's Boston University classmate and frequent collaborator Scott Rosenberg, remains a cult favorite and has been credited with reviving the career of Treat Williams. Denver marked Fleder's first work with several artists who have become recurring collaborators, including production designer/art director Nelson Coates, costume designer Abigail Murray, script supervisor Elizabeth Ludwick, and composer Steve Weisberg.

Since then, Fleder has directed a series of thrillers, including Kiss the Girls (1997), starring Ashley Judd and Morgan Freeman; Don't Say a Word (2001), featuring Brittany Murphy and Michael Douglas; Impostor (2002), a sci-fi thriller based on a Philip K. Dick short story, starring Gary Sinise, Madeleine Stowe, and Vincent D’Onofrio; and Runaway Jury (2003), starring John Cusack and Academy Award winners Gene Hackman and Dustin Hoffman, and based on the novel by John Grisham.

The Express, released in October 2008, stars Dennis Quaid, Rob Brown, and Charles S. Dutton.  The Express tells the story of Ernie Davis (1939–1963), the first African-American winner of the Heisman Trophy.

Fleder is a member of the Directors Guild's Special Projects Committee and has served as adjunct faculty at USC School of Cinema and Television. He and Scott Rosenberg sponsor an annual short screenplay contest at the Redstone Film Festival in Boston. He is depicted in Brian Michael Bendis' autobiographical graphic novel Fortune & Glory, which follows Bendis' exploits when Hollywood comes calling to adapt one of his works into a film.

Personal life

Filmography

Films
Things to Do in Denver When You're Dead (1995)
Kiss the Girls (1997)
Don't Say a Word (2001)
Impostor (2001)
Runaway Jury (2003)
The Express: The Ernie Davis Story (2008)
Homefront (2013)

Television
Air Time (1992)
The Companion (1994)
Happy Town (2010)
Life Unexpected (2010)
Vegas (2012)
Beauty & the Beast (pilot) (2012)
Star-Crossed (2014)Kingdom (2014 & 2015)Turn: Washington's Spies (2015)The Art of More (2015)A Midsummer's Nightmare (2017)The Bold Type (2017)Lincoln Rhyme: Hunt for the Bone Collector'' (2020) - episode #5: "Game On"

References

External links
Official website

1965 births
20th-century American Jews
American television directors
Boston University College of Communication alumni
Living people
People from Norfolk, Virginia
USC School of Cinematic Arts alumni
Film directors from Virginia
21st-century American Jews